USS Pope (DD-225) was a  in the United States Navy that served during World War II. She was the first ship named for John Pope.

Construction and commissioning
Pope was laid down 9 September 1919 and launched 23 March 1920 from William Cramp & Sons; sponsored by Mrs. William S. Benson; and commissioned 27 October 1920 at Philadelphia.

Service history
Pope was initially placed in reduced commission at Philadelphia and assigned to Squadron 3, Division 39 of the Atlantic Reserve Fleet. During 1921 she alternated between her winter base at Charleston, South Carolina and her summer one at Newport, Rhode Island and escorted President Warren G. Harding to Plymouth, Massachusetts 30 July – 1 August. She engaged in maneuvers with the battleship divisions off Guantanamo Bay from 12 January until her return to Philadelphia 27 April.

After a refit, Pope departed 12 May for duty in the Pacific. She passed through the Straits of Gibraltar 3 July and transited the Suez Canal 15–25 July. Pope joined Squadron 15, Division 43 of the Asiatic Fleet at Chefoo, China 26 August and participated in fleet exercises off Chefoo until her departure 28 October for her winter base at Cavite, Philippines.

In the Orient, Pope protected American lives and interests during the civil strife in China. She first served with the Yangtze River Patrol 9 September – 9 October 1923 and continued to make her presence known through repeated patrols until 1931.

Notable exceptions were duty off Japan in connection with the United States Army "Round the World Flight" in 1924, a visit to French Indochina in 1926, and a visit to Japan in 1929. From 1931 until 1937, the Pope continued to "show the flag" off the China coast, during the summers and spent the winters in the Philippines engaging in division maneuvers. She was reassigned to Squadron 5, Division 15 on 3 February 1933. Pope made visits to French Indochina in 1935 and in 1938, two visits to Japan in 1934 and 1935 and one to the Dutch East Indies in 1936.

Increased tension on China's northern borders due to the Japanese invasion of Manchuria made it necessary for Pope to evacuate Americans from northern Chinese ports such as Lao Yao and Tsingtao to Shanghai beginning 19 September 1937. From 15 July to 20 September 1938, she cruised in Chinese waters off Chinwangtao and returned 5 June 1939 with the South China Patrol force removing American consulates and nationals. Pope was stationed off Swatow and Pehtaiho during 14 June – 19 August, observing the Japanese Navy en route to Swatow and the subsequent bombing and occupation of the city. She remained in this area until her return to Manila 12 October for the Neutrality Patrol off the Philippines. Pope was transferred to Division 59 of the Asiatic Fleet 6 May 1940, and resumed patrolling off China during 11 May – 24 June. Pope returned to Manila in late June on neutrality duty and remained on station there until 11 December 1941, when she got underway for Balikpapan, Dutch East Indies.

World War II
Pope was heavily engaged in fighting in the Dutch East Indies in the early days of World War II. That transport had been part of the Pensacola Convoy and had left Brisbane 30 December 1941 with Army reinforcements composed of the 26th Field Artillery Brigade and Headquarters Battery, the 1st Battalion, 131st Field Artillery and supplies from that convoy destined for Java.

During the naval battle of Balikpapan she made close-quarter torpedo and gun attacks which helped delay Japanese landings at Balikpapan and later in the Battle of Badung Strait she impeded the invasion of the island of Bali. In the evening of 28 February 1942, Exeter and the two destroyers left Soerabaja and proceeded north. Japanese surface and air forces launched an attack the next morning, midway between the islands of Java and Borneo. As they sought to escape the three Allied ships fought four Japanese heavy cruisers and four destroyers throughout a fierce three-hour action, and they damaged a number of enemy ships. Pope fired all of her torpedoes and 140 salvoes of naval gunfire.

Fate / Wreck

The Allied squadron was discovered by Japanese cruiser float planes whose spotting of their cruisers' gunfire nullified the effectiveness of the Allied destroyers' attempt to conceal Exeter with a smoke screen. When the two British ships were destroyed by gunfire shortly before noon 1 March 1942, Pope found temporary refuge in a rain squall. Although the Japanese cruisers were evaded by a course change within the squall, Pope was rediscovered by aircraft from  after she emerged from the squall. After the destroyer's single 3-inch anti-aircraft gun failed, one of six dive-bombers scored a near miss which wrecked the port engine shaft and started flooding from damaged hull plating. Flooding worsened as Pope maneuvered to evade six more bombers, and only one crewman was lost as the crew boarded life rafts when flooding could no longer be controlled. Pope remained afloat long enough to be sunk about 2pm by the sixth salvo of a Japanese cruiser arriving on the scene. This was to be the start of a long, almost 60 hour ordeal for the men in the water, as the survivors from Pope would not be rescued until almost midnight on 3 March by the Japanese destroyer . The survivors from Encounter and Exeter were to be more fortunate, as those that were not rescued right after the battle on 1 March by the destroyer Inazuma, were rescued the following day by the Japanese destroyer , who picked up the last 400 odd survivors from those two ships on 2 March. These survivors had been adrift for about 22 hours in rafts and life jackets, or clinging to floats, many coated in oil, and some blinded. This humanitarian decision by Lieutenant Commander Shunsaku Kudō placed Ikazuchi at risk of attack, and it interfered with her fighting ability, due to the sheer load of rescued sailors. The action was later the subject of several books and articles  
and a 2007 TV programme.

Pope was struck from the Naval Vessel Register on 8 May 1942. She received two battle stars and the Presidential Unit Citation for her World War II service. Unfortunately commercial salvage divers had discovered Pope previously and save for a skeleton, little now remains of her wreck. With her location/identification now being finally confirmed, all ships lost during the Battle of the Java Sea and subsequent engagements have now been discovered/located and positively identified.

See also
Richard Antrim, executive officer of the USS Pope, Medal of Honor recipient.

References

Notes

Bibliography

External links
http://www.navsource.org/archives/05/225.htm
http://www.uboat.net/allies/warships/ship/2334.html

 

Clemson-class destroyers
World War II destroyers of the United States
Ships built by William Cramp & Sons
Destroyers sunk by aircraft
World War II shipwrecks in the Java Sea
1920 ships
Maritime incidents in March 1942
Ships sunk by Japanese aircraft